Nangal Lubana  is a village in Bhulath Tehsil in Kapurthala district of Punjab State, India. The village is administrated by a Sarpanch, who is an elected representative of village as per the constitution of India and Panchayati raj (India).

Demographics 
As per 2011 Census of India, Nangal Lubana had 958 number of households and total population was 4,318 persons. There were total of 2,192 males, 2,126 females in 2011 in this village. The total number of children of 6 years or below were 456 in the village.  Average Sex Ratio of village was 970 which is higher than Punjab state average of 895.

List of cities near the village 
Bhulath
Kapurthala 
Phagwara 
Sultanpur Lodhi

Air travel connectivity 
The closest International airport to the village is Sri Guru Ram Dass Jee International Airport.

References

External links
 DISTRICT CENSUS HANDBOOK KAPURTHALA 2011 - VILLAGE AND TOWN WISE PRIMARY CENSUS ABSTRACT (PCA)
 Villages in Kapurthala
 List of Villages in Kapurthala Tehsil

Villages in Kapurthala district